Zeng Shunxi (born October 9, 1997), also known as Joseph Zeng, is a Chinese actor and singer.

Career
Zeng debuted as part of the boy group Fresh Geek in 2014; he left in 2015 to pursue solo acting activities. He made his acting debut in the comedy drama Happy Mitan in 2016. The same year, he made his film debut in the action film Out of Control.

Zeng gained recognition for his role as Tang Thirty-Six in the fantasy action drama Fighter of the Destiny.
He then played lead roles in the youth dramas When We Were Young and Take My Brother Away.

In 2019, Zeng played the role of Zhang Wuji in the wuxia television series Heavenly Sword and Dragon Slaying Saber, based on the novel of the same name by Jin Yong. The same year, he starred in the family drama Over the Sea I Come to You playing the role of Sun Honglei's son.

Filmography

Film

Television series

Television show

Discography

Singles

Awards and nominations

References

External links
IMDB
Zeng Shunxi on Sina Weibo
Zeng Shunxi on Instagram

1997 births
Living people
Male actors from Guangdong
21st-century Chinese male actors
Chinese male television actors
Singers from Guangdong
21st-century Chinese male singers